= Mordellistena y-nigrum =

Scientific classification
- Kingdom: Animalia
- Phylum: Arthropoda
- Clade: Pancrustacea
- Class: Insecta
- Order: Coleoptera
- Suborder: Polyphaga
- Infraorder: Cucujiformia
- Family: Mordellidae
- Genus: Mordellistena
- Species: M. y-nigrum

Binomial name
- Mordellistena y-nigrum Ray, 1937

Species of beetle

Mordellistena y-nigrum is a species of beetle in the family Mordellidae. It was described in 1937 by Eugene Ray from Puerto Rico. It is named for its diagnostic characteristic, a Y-shaped black spot on the region of the elytra surrounding the scutellum.

This beetle measures 2.25 mm (0.089 in) in length, or 3.1 mm (0.12 in) when including the anal stylus. The antennae are 1 mm (0.039 in) long.
